Enter Air Sp. z o.o. is a Polish charter airline with its head office in Warsaw, Poland, and main base at Warsaw Chopin Airport and Katowice Airport. It operates holiday and charter flights out of its hubs in Poznań, Warsaw and Wrocław.

History

On 25 April 2010, Enter Air completed its inaugural flight from Warsaw to Enfidha. The airline cooperates with major tour operators in Poland and operates mainly from Poland to popular holiday destinations. Its low-cost model helped it grow over 300% between 2010 and 2012, despite the rising fuel prices and the events in Tunisia and Egypt (Q1 2011), which made some airlines reduce their fleet or even disappear from the market.

Enter Air Group is listed on the Warsaw Stock Exchange since its IPO on 14 December 2015.

Fleet

As of July 2021, the Enter Air fleet consists of 24 Boeing 737-800 and two Boeing 737 MAX 8 (which it brands 737-8) with orders in place for an additional six and options on a further two.

References

External links 

Airlines of Poland
Airlines established in 2010
Charter airlines
Companies based in Warsaw
Polish brands
Polish companies established in 2010